The Mantle Rock Archeological District, near Smithland, Kentucky is a  historic district which was listed on the National Register of Historic Places in 2004.

The site is owned and protected by the Kentucky Nature Conservancy and is accessed by a gravel road off of Kentucky Route 133, just west of the small community of Joy, Kentucky.  It includes a natural sandstone arch, several springs, and woodland, in a valley in the watershed of McGilligan Creek.  It includes a part of the original Salem-Golconda Road.  It is associated with the Cherokee Trail of Tears.

It includes a contributing site and a contributing structure.

References

Historic districts on the National Register of Historic Places in Kentucky
National Register of Historic Places in Livingston County, Kentucky
Archaeological sites on the National Register of Historic Places in Kentucky
Nature Conservancy preserves
Trail of Tears
Native American history of Kentucky
Caves of Kentucky
Sandstone formations of the United States